The 1956 Nations motorcycle Grand Prix was the sixth and final round of the 1956 Grand Prix motorcycle racing season. It took place on 9 September 1956 at the Autodromo Nazionale Monza.

500 cc classification

350 cc classification

250 cc classification

125 cc classification

Sidecar classification

References

Italian motorcycle Grand Prix
Nations Grand Prix
Nations Grand Prix